Albert Champion may refer to:

Albert Champion (cricketer) (1851–1909), Yorkshire cricketer
Albert Champion (cyclist) (1878–1927), French road racing cyclist